The 2004–05 United Counties League season was the 98th in the history of the United Counties League, a football competition in England.

Premier Division

The Premier Division featured 21 clubs which competed in the division last season, along with one new club:
Potton United, promoted from Division One

League table

Division One

Division One featured 17 clubs which competed in the division last season, along with one new club:
Sleaford Town, joined from the Lincolnshire League

Also, Cottingham changed name to Corby Cottingham.

League table

References

External links
 United Counties League

9
United Counties League seasons